The Adventure Club is a Canadian children's fantasy film, directed by Geoff Anderson and released in 2016. The film centers on Ricky, Bill and Sandy, three young kids who discover a magic box that grants wishes, and must protect it from Langley (Billy Zane), a greedy businessman who wants it to help him attain his dream of purchasing and redeveloping the local science centre.

The film's cast also includes Robin Dunne, Gabrielle Miller, Lorne Cardinal and Kim Coates. The screenplay was written by Dunne and Fred Ewanuick, and the film was produced in Saskatchewan in the fall of 2015.

It was distributed in Canada under a unique model, in which it received a one-day screening in several Canadian markets on October 8, 2016. Some of the proceeds from each screening were donated to the local chapter of the Boys & Girls Clubs of Canada.

References

External links
 

2016 films
Canadian children's fantasy films
English-language Canadian films
Films shot in Saskatchewan
Films shot in Alberta
2010s English-language films
2010s Canadian films